Exploits was a community located on Burnt Island, Newfoundland, Canada. Its strategic location made it an ideal hub for sealing, fishing, and trading with Labrador. But by the late 1960s, the community had been largely resettled. Today, the community only consists of seasonal residents.

See also
 List of communities in Newfoundland and Labrador

References

Ghost towns in Newfoundland and Labrador